William Grundy may refer to:
 William Grundy (footballer, fl. 1906–1911), midfielder for Blackpool and Bolton Wanderers
 William Grundy (footballer, born 1914) (1914 – after 1935), English footballer for Coventry City and Mansfield Town
 William Mitchell Grundy, English headmaster
 William Grundy, a character on the radio series The Archers
 Bill Grundy, English television presenter
 Bill Grundy (footballer), Australian rules footballer